Rail Infrastructure Corporation, later known as Country Rail Infrastructure Authority after July 2010, was a Government of New South Wales statutory corporation with responsibility for the management of the railway network in rural New South Wales, Australia.

Rail Infrastructure Corporation was accountable to its two voting shareholders, the Treasurer and Minister for Transport.

History
In January 2001 Rail Infrastructure Corporation was formed taking over responsibility for ownership and maintenance of the infrastructure from Rail Access Corporation and Railway Services Authority.

In January 2004, after much criticism and public perceptions of blame shifting between units for operational failings, RailCorp was formed taking over the passenger train operations from the State Rail Authority and responsibility for maintaining the greater metropolitan network from Rail Infrastructure Corporation.

In September 2004 Rail Infrastructure Corporation leased the interstate and Hunter Valley lines to the Government of Australia owned Australian Rail Track Corporation for 60 years. The lines covered by the lease are:
Main South line between Macarthur and Albury
North Coast line between Broadmeadow and the Queensland border
Main North line between Maitland and Werris Creek
Broken Hill line between Parkes and Broken Hill
Unanderra to Moss Vale line
Sandy Hollow to Gulgong line
Stockinbingal to Parkes line
Parkes to Narromine line
Troy Junction to Merrygoen line

Rail Infrastructure Corporation also contracted operational responsibility of the remainder of its country branch lines to the Australian Rail Track Corporation, however from January 2012 this was transferred to the John Holland Group.

In July 2010, Rail Infrastructure Corporation ceased to be a state owned corporation, becoming a statutory corporation renamed the Country Rail Infrastructure Authority. In July 2012 the Country Rail Infrastructure Authority was abolished and its responsibilities transferred to Transport for NSW.

External links
Country Rail Infrastructure Authority website
Rail Corporation website

References

Defunct government entities of New South Wales
Railway companies of New South Wales
2001 establishments in Australia
2012 disestablishments in Australia